This is a list of years in the Bahamas. See also the history of the Bahamas.  For only articles about years in the Bahamas that have been written, see :Category:Years in the Bahamas.

21st century

20th century

19th century

18th century

See also 
 List of years by country

 
Bahamas-related lists
Bahamas